Vermont Route 3 (VT 3) is a  north–south state highway in Rutland County, Vermont, United States. It runs from the town of Rutland to Pittsford.

Route description
VT 3 begins at an intersection with U.S. Route 4 Business in the Rutland community of Rutland Center. In the center of the community of Proctor, VT 3 turns to the northeast, crossing into Pittsford and gradually becoming closer to US 7 before terminating at the route southeast of the community of Pittsford.

Major intersections

References

External links

003
Transportation in Rutland County, Vermont